This Beautiful Life is the third studio album by the swing band Big Bad Voodoo Daddy. It was released in 1999 on Coolsville/Interscope Records.

Critical reception
The Washington Post wrote that the album "borrows not only from swing but even more so from jump-blues and more recent roots-rock to provide a mongrelized, horn-fueled vehicle for Scotty Morris's songs." The Los Angeles Times thought that "there is some predictable, Krupa-esque drumming, and little attempt to push the genre in any new directions."

Track listing

Personnel
Scotty Morris - vocals, guitar
Karl Hunter - clarinet, soprano saxophone, tenor saxophone
Andy Rowley - baritone saxophone, background vocals
Glen "The Kid" Marhevka - trumpet, cornet
Joshua Levy - piano
Dirk Shumaker - acoustic bass, background vocals
Kurt Sodergren - drums

Charts

References

1999 albums
Big Bad Voodoo Daddy albums
Interscope Records albums